Palophinae is a subfamily of the stick insect family Diapheromeridae. They belong to the superfamily Anareolatae of suborder Verophasmatodea.

Altogether about 20 species of Palophinae are known to date. They have a relictual distribution and are endemic to the southern Africa, with one occurring as far north as the Gulf of Guinea.

Systematics
This is the smallest and least diverse of the Diapheromeridae subfamilies. Sometimes this subfamily is held to contain a single tribe Palophini, but this is redundant as long as no basal members of this lineage are known e.g. as fossils. Of its mere two genera, one is fairly speciose (with new species still being discovered), but the other is monotypic.

The genera are:
 Bactrododema Stål, 1858 (including Palophus)
 Dematobactron Karny, 1923

Footnotes

References

  (2004): Taxonomic notes on giant southern African stick insects (Phasmida), including the description of a new Bactrododema species. Annals of the Transvaal Museum 41: 61–77. HTML abstract
  (2009): Phasmida SpeciesFile – Palophinae. Version of 2009-SEP-28. Retrieved 2011-APR-19.

Phasmatodea subfamilies
Phasmatodea